Gareth P. Jones is an English children's writer, and author of the Dragon Detective Agency series of books.

He is best known for his comic-gothic book The Considine Curse, which won the Blue Peter Book Award in 2012, and for The Thornthwaite Inheritance. He also writes a series of books called Ninja Meerkats.

As well as being an author, Gareth works as a TV producer.

Published books
The Dragon Detective Agency: The Case of the Missing Cats (2006)
The Dragon Detective Agency: The Case of the Wayward Professor (2007)
The Dragon Detective Agency:The Case of the Vanished Sea Dragon (2008)
The Dragon Detective Agency: The Case of the Stolen Film (2008)
Perry's 5 (2009)
The Thornthwaite Inheritance (2009)
The Space Crime Conspiracy (2010)
The Considine Curse (2011)
The Clan of the Scorpion (Ninja Meerkats 1) (2011)
The Eye of the Monkey (Ninja Meerkats 2) (2011)
The Escape from Ice Mountain (Ninja Meerkats 3) (2011)
Hollywood Showdown (Ninja Meerkats 4) (2012)
The Tomb of Doom (Ninja Meerkats 5) (2012)
The Big City Bust-Up (Ninja Meerkats 6) (2012)
The Ultimate Dragon Warrior (Ninja Meerkats 7) (2013)
Outback Attack (Ninja Meerkats 8) (2013)
Constable and Toop (2012)
No True Echo (2015) The Thornthwaite Betrayal ( 2016 ) The Big Book of NothingDeath or icecream? ( 2016 )''

References

External links

British children's writers
British horror writers
British mystery writers
Living people
Year of birth missing (living people)
Place of birth missing (living people)